The 2017 Pan American Rhythmic Gymnastics Championships were held in Daytona Beach, United States, October 13–15, 2017. The competition was organized by USA Gymnastics, and approved by the International Gymnastics Federation.

Medal summary

Senior medalists

Junior medalists

Medal table

References

2017 in gymnastics
Pan American Gymnastics Championships
International gymnastics competitions hosted by the United States
2017 in American sports